John Hyrcanus II (Yohanan Hurqanos) (died 30 BCE), a member of the Hasmonean dynasty, was for a long time the Jewish High Priest in the 1st century BCE. He was also briefly King of Judea 67–66 BCE and then the ethnarch (ruler) of Judea, probably over the period 47–40 BCE.

Accession
Hyrcanus was the eldest son of Alexander Jannaeus, King and High Priest, and Alexandra Salome. After the death of Alexander in 76 BCE, his widow succeeded to the rule of Judea and installed her elder son Hyrcanus as High Priest. Alexander had numerous conflicts with the Pharisees. However Hyrcanus was supported by the Pharisees, especially later in his tenure.

When Salome died in 67 BCE, she named Hyrcanus as her successor as ruler of Judea as well,<ref name=je>[http://www.jewishencyclopedia.com/articles/7973-hyrcanus-ii "Hyrcanus II", Jewish Encyclopedia"]</ref> but soon he and his younger brother, Aristobulus II, dissented over the right to the throne.

Deposition
Hyrcanus had scarcely reigned three months when Aristobulus II rose in rebellion. Hyrcanus advanced against him at the head of his mercenaries and his followers. The brothers met in a battle near Jericho with many of Hyrcanus' soldiers going over to Aristobulus II, and thereby gave the latter the victory.Josephus (Antiquities 14.1.2); Babylonian Talmud (Baba Kama 82b)

Hyrcanus took refuge in the citadel of Jerusalem; but the capture of the Temple by Aristobulus II compelled Hyrcanus to surrender. A peace was then concluded in which Hyrcanus was to renounce the throne and the office of high priest, but was to enjoy the revenues of the latter office.

Alliance with the Nabataeans
This agreement did not last.  Hyrcanus feared that Aristobulus was planning his death. Such fears were furthered by Hyrcanus' adviser, Antipater the Idumean. According to Josephus, Antipater sought to control Judea by putting the weak Hyrcanus back onto the throne. Hyrcanus took refuge with Aretas III, King of the Nabataeans, who had been bribed by Antipater into supporting Hyrcanus' cause through the promise of returning Arabian towns taken by the Hasmoneans.

The Nabataeans advanced toward Jerusalem with an army of 50,000, took the city and besieged the Temple where Aristobulus had taken refuge for several months. During the siege, Josephus states that the adherents of Hyrcanus stoned the pious Onias (Honi ha'Me'agel, also Khoni or Choni ha-Me'agel), who had refused to pray for the demise of their opponents, and further angered the priests who were fighting along with Aristobulus by selling them cattle for the paschal sacrifice for the enormous price of one thousand drachmae and then refused to deliver the promised animals for the sacrifice.(Antiquities of the Jews'' Book 14, 2:2)

Roman intervention

During the Roman civil war, general Pompey defeated armies of the kingdoms of Pontus and the Seleucids. He sent his deputy Marcus Aemilius Scaurus to take possession of Seleucid Syria.

As the Hasmoneans were allies of the Romans, both brothers appealed to Scaurus, each endeavouring through gifts and promises to win him over to his side. Scaurus, moved by a gift of 400 talents, decided in favour of Aristobulus and ordered Aretas to withdraw his army. During his retreat, the Nabateans suffered a crushing defeat at the hands of Aristobulus. Scaurus returned to Damascus.

When Pompey arrived in Syria in 63 BCE, both brothers and a third party that desired the removal of the entire dynasty (according to some sources, these may have been the representatives of the Pharisees), sent their delegates to Pompey, who delayed making a decision. He favoured Hyrcanus over Aristobulus, deeming the elder, weaker brother a more reliable ally of the Roman Empire.

Aristobulus, suspicious of Pompey's intentions, entrenched himself in the fortress of Alexandrium, but when the Roman army approached Judea, he surrendered and undertook to deliver Jerusalem over to them. However, since many of his followers were unwilling to open the gates, the Romans besieged and captured the city by force, badly damaging city and the temple. Aristobulus was taken to Rome a prisoner and Hyrcanus restored as high priest in Jerusalem.

Restoration
By around 63 BCE, Hyrcanus had been restored to his position as High Priest but not to the Kingship. Political authority rested with the Romans whose interests were represented by Antipater, who primarily promoted the interests of his own house. In 47 BCE, Julius Caesar restored some political authority to Hyrcanus by appointing him ethnarch. This however had little practical effect, since Hyrcanus yielded to Antipater in everything.

Exile

In 40 BCE, Aristobulus' son Antigonus Mattathias allied himself with the Parthians and was proclaimed King and High Priest. Hyrcanus was seized and his ears mutilated (according to Josephus, Antigonus bit his uncle's ears off) to make him permanently ineligible for the priesthood.

Then Hyrcanus was taken by the Parthians into captivity in Babylonia, where he lived for four years amid the Babylonian Jews, who paid him every mark of respect.

Return to Jerusalem and death
In 36 BCE, Herod I, who had vanquished Antigonus with Roman help and feared that Hyrcanus might persuade the Parthians to help him regain the throne, invited the former High Priest to return to Jerusalem. Hyrcanus accepted and Herod received him with every mark of respect, assigning to him the first place at his table and the presidency of the state council.

However, in 30 BCE Herod charged Hyrcanus with plotting with the Nabateans and put him to death.  Josephus states that Hyrcanus was 80 years old at the time of his death.

Biblical scholar Gregory Doudna proposed in 2013 that Hyrcanus II was the figure known as the Teacher of Righteousness in the Qumran Scrolls. According to Doudna, Hyrcanus II’s sectarian orientation is now generally understood to have been Sadducee.

See also
Hasmonean coinage
Hyrcania
Siege of Jerusalem (disambiguation), list of sieges for, and battles of, Jerusalem

References

Bibliography

Sources
 
Flavius Josephus, Antiquities of the Jews, book XIV, 5-13.
Flavius Josephus, The Jewish War, book I, 8-13.

Literature
Heinrich Ewald, Geschichte des Volkes Israel, volume IV, p. 524ff.
Heinrich Graetz, History of the Jews, volume III, p. 167ff.
Hitzig, Geschichte des Volkes Israel, volume II, p. 500ff.
Emil Schürer, Geschichte des judischen Volks im Zeitalter Jesu Christi, volume I, p. 338 et seq.

30 BC deaths
1st-century BC Hasmonean monarchs
1st-century BCE High Priests of Israel
Year of birth unknown
Prisoners and detainees of the Parthian Empire